This is the complete list of Asian Games medalists in ju-jitsu since 2018.

Men's ne-waza

56 kg

62 kg

69 kg

77 kg

85 kg

94 kg

Women's ne-waza

49 kg

62 kg

References

External links 
Ju-Jitsu Results Book

Ju-jitsu
medalists